Dianne Dialecti "Di" Nicolios (born 1947) is a retired Australian Anglican priest. She was the first woman appointed Archdeacon for Women's Ministries in the Anglican Diocese of Sydney. She held that position from January 1994 to May 2002. She was also one of the first group of 14 women to be ordained a deacon in 1989 in the Sydney diocese.

In 2002, Nicolios resigned as archdeacon to become an ordained priest in the Anglican Diocese of Melbourne and rector of St John's parish in Diamond Creek, Melbourne. She later became Archdeacon of The Yarra, then an assistant priest in the parish of Kew and returned to Sydney as an assistant at Christ Church Lavender Bay.

Life and ministry 
At the October 1993 synod of the Sydney Anglican diocese, Archbishop Harry Goodhew announced Nicolios' appointment, "With a view to advancing the ministry of women in the Diocese, I have appointed the Reverend Dianne Nicolios as an Archdeacon with special responsibilities for women's ministry. She has an extensive job description which includes the support and encouragement of women both ordained and non-ordained." Her name was sometimes recorded as Archdeacon D.D. Nicolios. Her title within the Anglican church was Venerable Di Nicolios. During her time as archdeacon, Nicolios developed a strategy for ministry by women, both lay and ordained and organised conferences for women in ministry.

At the same synod, Nicolios was elected to the board of management of the Department of Evangelism and as a diocesan representative on General Synod. During the Sydney period she was a member of the Olympic Games Taskforce and helped establish Anglican Sports Ministries, was a member of the Minute Reading Committee, the Synod Committee on Clergy Tenure, the Stipends and Allowances Committee, the Synod Standing Committee, and the Board of Management of the Department of Evangelism. She was an Associate Evangelist, Department of Evangelism. As chair of Anglican Deaconess Institution, she established scholarships for women to open up new areas of ministry.

In his presidential address to the October 1994 synod, Archbishop Goodhew stated, "I have a special concern for the ministries exercised by women in our diocese. Last October I announced the appointment of the Reverend Dianne Nicolios as an Archdeacon with special responsibilities for women’s ministry. Dianne took up her appointment in January this year. She has become a valued member my staff. Her wisdom, good humour and courage have come to be appreciated by all of us who work with her ... The gifts and talents of women and men must be harnessed fully if we are to achieve that measure of fullness which God wills for us. The work of Archdeacon Nicolios is important in giving recognition to the role of women in ministry in the diocese, and in advancing their opportunities for service."

The archbishop asked Nicolios to report to him on the ministry of women and the report was released to the standing committee in 1996. The report included results of a survey on women's ministry of clergy and church members. Nicolios found two results significant: majority support amongst clergy for women to be assistant ministers including as teachers, preachers and service leaders; and from women in ministry, the desire for acknowledgement and valuing of their ministries. Some recommendations were “That a review of diocesan policies be made by Archdeacon Nicolios in consultation with the Archbishop ......” “That a Women’s Advisory Council be established by the Archbishop .....” “That the issues raised in this report ..... be promoted for discussion within the Diocese ...”  Nicolios organised the 1998 Conference on Women's Ministry, proposed by the Archbishop to "encourage and strengthen the ministries of women in our churches".  Two papers for and against the ordination of women as priests were discussed at that conference. Nicolios gave an overview of part time and voluntary work conducted by women in the diocese and other women ministers presented on their work with women.

In 2002, Nicolios resigned and became rector of St John's in Diamond Creek, Melbourne. The Sydney diocese does not ordain women as priests and the resignation of Nicolios and her subsequent ordination in Melbourne was reportedly a surprise to the Sydney Anglicans including the new archbishop, the Most Revd Peter Jensen, as she had not been an activist for women's ordination. However Nicolios and the archbishop have said that she left the Sydney Anglican diocese on good terms.

In 2009 after the Black Saturday bushfires in Victoria, Nicolios managed local bushfire relief, counselling and support through St John's.

In April 2019, the 30th anniversary celebration of women's ordination into the diaconate was held at St Andrew’s Cathedral in Sydney. Most of the women ordained as deacons in 1989 attended, including Nicolios who gave the main address, preaching on 2 Timothy 4:1-8.

Positions held 

 Late 1970s: Secondary school teacher of English and Greek and member, Board of Senior School Studies
 1980s: Student, Moore Theological College obtaining a Bachelor of Theology
 1983-1989: Parish sister, Annandale
 1989: Ordained as deacon in Sydney Anglican diocese
 1989-1991: Assistant minister, St Aidan's Annandale
 1992-1993: Chaplain, Deaconess House 
 1998-2002: President, Australian Anglican Diaconal Association
 1994–2002: Archdeacon for Women's Ministries, Anglican Diocese of Sydney
 24 July 2002: Ordained priest at Holy Trinity, Doncaster, by Archbishop Peter Watson.
 2002–2003: Priest-in-charge of St John's Anglican church, Diamond Creek parish, Victoria, appointed effective 26 July 2002.
 2003-2013: Incumbent, Parish of St John's Diamond Creek with St Katherine's St Helena and St Michael's Yarrambat
 2004-2010: Examining Chaplain, Archbishop of Melbourne
 2013-2015: Permission to Officiate, Diocese of Melbourne
 2003 (and 2007?): National chaplain, GFS Australia (formerly Girls Friendly Society).
 2006-2010: Area Dean, Yarra/Plenty
 2007: Member of the E-team, a group of current and former Sydney Anglican ministers formed to assist church leaders in mission and outreach.
 2010-2013: Archdeacon of The Yarra.
 2013–2015: Assistant Priest/Seniors' Minister, Parish of Kew, North Balwyn/St Hilary's and St Silas Anglican churches in Kew, Victoria.

 2015: Retired and returned to Sydney.
 2018–2019: A member of the Professional Standards Review Board for Kooyoora Ltd and Diocese of Melbourne.
 2017-: Assistant Minister, Christ Church Lavender Bay, Sydney.

References

External links 

 Photo of Di Nicolios at the time of her appointment as Archdeacon for Women's Ministries
 https://www.gettyimages.com.au/detail/news-photo/dianne-nicolios-who-will-become-the-first-anglican-female-news-photo/1081556552 year
 Photos of the 30th year celebration of the first ordination of women deacons in 1989
 https://www.deaconessministries.org.au/news/history-in-the-making
 Photo of the 1989 ordination of women deacons
 https://sydneyanglicans.net/news/praise-god-for-the-ministry-of-women/48748
 Sermon 1 Peter 5:1-14, Christ Church Lavender Bay
 https://www.cclb.org.au/uploads/1/2/1/1/121163214/1_peter_51-14_1.mp3

Living people
Place of birth missing (living people)
Archdeacons of Sydney
Women Anglican clergy
21st-century Australian Anglican priests
20th-century Anglican clergy
20th-century Australian women
21st-century Australian women
Anglican Diocese of Melbourne
Archdeacons of Melbourne
1947 births